Barber Motorsports Park is an  multi-purpose racing facility located in Birmingham, Alabama. It was built by George W. Barber, and includes the  Barber Vintage Motorsport Museum. It has been the site of the IndyCar Series' Grand Prix of Alabama since 2010. The Annual Barber Vintage Festival has taken place at the park each October since 2005. Barber Motorsports Park is also the home of the Porsche Track Experience.

Barber Motorsports Park is classified as an FIA Grade Two circuit.

Track

The park, which opened in 2003, has a 16-turn,  road course, designed by Alan Wilson.

The pit lane is to the outside of the track, parallel to the front stretch. Two cutoff turns, which are barricaded when not in use, allow the track to be shortened for testing sessions or promoter events.

The area outside of the front stretch, bounded by the track on three sides, is occupied by the multi-level paddock. A building along the front straightaway, between start/finish and Turn 1, houses a media center, a race control area, track offices, garages, and some VIP viewing areas.

The track does not have permanent grandstands. The main spectator area is along the back stretch, between turns 8 and 11; here spectators can watch from embankments, or from temporary grandstands erected for race weekends. From this area, most of the course, except for Turns 2, 3, and 13, is visible. A food and souvenir vending area is located in the vicinity of turns 9/10. Additional spectator areas are outside of Turns 2, 3, and 14. An event-related RV park and camping area is located atop a hill behind the paddock. There is generally no spectator access to the infield. However, an entryway underneath the course at Turn 12 allows emergency and maintenance vehicles to access the infield area.

The track has hosted numerous motorsport races including the IndyCar Series, Grand-Am, Vintage Racing Series events, American Historic Racing Motorcycle Association (AHRMA) racing, and MotoAmerica. It serves as the home of the Porsche Track Experience. It has hosted the Keith Code California Superbike School and the Yamaha Champions Riding School. Barber is noted for its landscaping and greenery; the track has been referred to as "The Augusta National of Motorsports".

The IndyCar Series had tests at Barber in 2007 and 2009.

The track had also been nominated by the FIA as the official test track for the now-closed down US F1 Team.

Barber Proving Ground 
The  Barber Proving Ground opened in 2014 to serve as an additional test facility for the Barber Museum. The configurable track and adjacent 150-foot-by-350-foot wet/dry skid pad are used for a variety of purposes, including defensive driver training, safety instruction, product debuts, and vehicle testing.

Located on the hill overlooking the proving ground is a two-level,  building that provides rental space for meetings, luncheons, product introductions, and seminars.

Two multi-use garage units totaling  also stand in the vicinity of the Barber Proving Grounds. The garages support the Porsche Track Experience, Mercedes-Benz USA Brand Immersion Program, promoters’ events, and other programs in the park.

Vehicle Off-Road Courses 
Vintage Motocross: Barber Motorsports Park has a  vintage motocross course. The inaugural event on the motocross took place during the 11th Annual Barber Vintage Festival with AHRMA presenting vintage motorcycle racing. Other uses of the motocross include product introductions by off-road vehicle manufacturers.

Vehicle Off-Road Course: The vehicle off-road course consists of approximately seven miles of trails confined to a  site adjoining the Barber Proving Ground. It can be configured into different layouts and is also multi-directional. The trails have varying terrain and provide moderate-to-extreme elevation conditions. Natural features such as water, rock, and bridge crossings have been incorporated into the trail system.

Obstacle Course: Consisting of unique obstacles for off-road vehicles and ATVs, the obstacle course is a natural trail consisting of a loop with nine features. There is an observation deck bordering the obstacle course for people to view the course below.

Seasonal activities 
Garden club park tours take place at Barber Motorsports Park year-round and utilize an open-air tram and tour guide. The tour, which is free for garden groups, starts off in front of the Barber Museum. The garden tours feature the park’s various plant collections, such as the 17 cloned Hightower Willow Oaks, which only exist in two places other than Barber Motorsports Park.

Sculpture
The infield of the track has a number of large sculptures, including a series of large steel spiders and dragonflies created by artist Bill Secunda, a pair of lions, and a sisyphean figure pushing a boulder. The Turns 5 & 6 complex is referred to as Charlotte's Web because of the presence of a large spider sculpture prominently placed in the infield near the turn and because it is one of the track's prime passing opportunities.

Barber Motorsports Park features five large steel gates fabricated by Branko Medenica that bear motorsports and wildlife themes. A functional kinetic, wind-powered sculpture created by artist Edward Lee Hendricks is located nearby a pond along the track's perimeter road. Another art commission by Hendricks is located at the nearby Birmingham-Shuttlesworth International Airport. Standing in front of the Barber Museum are three stainless steel monuments by sculptor Theodore Gall, called The Chase. The Gall installation took over a year to create and collectively weighs close to five tons.

Barber Vintage Motorsport Museum

George Barber had a serious interest in vintage motorcycles and recognized that there was no museum that reflects the history of motorcycles around the world. He wanted to preserve motorcycle history in the United States in a way that represents an international aspect and to supply examples of motorcycles that until then could only have been seen in books and magazines.

The Barber Vintage Motorsports Museum began in 1988 as Barber's private collection. However, in 1994, he established the Barber Vintage Motorsports Museum as a 501(c)(3) nonprofit organization. In 1997 the Barber Museum sent 21 motorcycles to New York's Guggenheim Museum for exhibit in The Art of the Motorcycle; the exhibit also traveled to Chicago and the Guggenheim Museum Bilboa. After the success of The Art of the Motorcycle, Barber set out to create a unique facility complete with a track. In designing the complex, Barber consulted with world champion racers John Surtees and Dan Gurney. In 2003, the Barber Museum was relocated to its permanent home in Barber Motorsports Park.

The museum contains more than 1,600 vintage and modern motorcycles and racing cars. It is considered the largest motorcycle museum in the world, as well as the largest collection of Lotus race cars. The motorcycle collection includes bikes dating from 1904 to present production. More than 900 motorcycles are on display. They come from 16 countries and represent over 140 different marques from as far away from the US as Australia, New Zealand, and Sweden.

Track records

The fastest official race lap records on the Barber Motorsports Park are listed as:

References

External links 

 
 
 

2003 establishments in Alabama
Motorsport venues in Alabama
Automobile museums in Alabama
Motorcycle museums in the United States
Museums in Birmingham, Alabama
Sports venues in Birmingham, Alabama
IndyCar Series tracks
Lotus Cars